Brigooda is a rural locality in the South Burnett Region, Queensland, Australia.

Geography
The Boyne River forms the western and northern boundaries, with the northern comprising the upper reaches of Lake Boondooma, the reservoir behind the Boondooma Dam. The Proston Boondooma Road passes through from east to west.

History 
The area was originally known as Lawson, being the name of the parish which was named after pastoralist Alexander Robertson Lawson, who established the Boondooma pastoral run in 1847-1848.

Lawson State School opened on 16 June 1924, but by 1925 it was renamed Brigooda State School. It closed on 24 January 1965. It was at 2473 Proston Boondooma Road.

Education 
There are no schools in Bigooda. The nearest government primary schools are Durong State School in neighbouring Durong to the south-west and Proston State School in Proston to the east. The nearest government secondary school is Proston State School which provides secondary education to Year 10. There are no nearby schools offering secondary education to Year 12; options are distance education and boarding school.

References

Further reading 
 —includes the schools at Abbeywood, Brigooda, Hivesville, Kinleymore, Speedwell.

South Burnett Region
Localities in Queensland